David Stuart Hodgson MBE (born 21 October 1959) is the directly elected mayor of the Borough of Bedford in Bedfordshire, England. Hodgson is the second elected mayor to represent the Liberal Democrats in the United Kingdom.

Hodgson was elected to office in a by-election held on 15 October 2009, following the death of previous mayor, Frank Branston.

Early life and career
Hodgson has lived in Bedford since he was nine years old. He attended Mark Rutherford School, where his father was headmaster. Attaining a degree in Computing and Business, Hodgson's career outside politics has included IT, lecturing and operating his own secretarial services business.

Political career

Hodgson was elected to Bedford Borough Council in 2002, representing Kingsbrook. After the 2009 local elections, Hodgson became leader of the Liberal Democrat group on the council, and was also appointed an executive member with the Portfolio for Partnerships and IT by the mayor, Frank Branston.

After the death of Branston in August 2009, Hodgson was selected as the Liberal Democrat candidate for the mayoral by-election which was held on October 15, 2009. Hodgson gained 9,428 votes in the first round of the election, to his nearest opponent's 9,105.  In the second round he gained a further 4,127 votes, and was declared winner.

In May 2011, he was re-elected mayor for a second term, winning 19,966 in the first round to his opponent's 17,501, and then gained a further 4,325 in the second round to win by a majority of 4,966.

In May 2015, he was elected mayor a third time, with 25,282 first-round votes, with Conservative Jas Parmar polling 19,417. With the low-ranked candidates eliminated and second-preference votes taken into account Hodgson had 35,302 compared to his opponent's 26,513, a majority of 8,789.

Hodgson was appointed Member of the Order of the British Empire (MBE) in the 2016 Birthday Honours for services to local government.

Personal life

Hodgson lives in the Kingsbrook area of Bedford with his wife, Christine. His interests and pursuits include gardening, golf, and watching football with his wife.

References

External links
 Mayoral election campaign website
 

Mayors of places in Bedfordshire
Liberal Democrat (UK) elected mayors
Liberal Democrats (UK) councillors
Living people
People educated at Mark Rutherford School
1959 births
Members of the Order of the British Empire